Keep On Keeping On may refer to

This phrase was used by Edgar Cayce on December 15, 1931 when he was asked the question "Is there more that I can do at this time".  His response started with "Keep on, keeping on". (Source Association for Research and Enlightenment, The Edgar Cayce readings 262-7)

Film 
 Keep On Keepin' On (film), a 2014 documentary about jazz musician Clark Terry

Music

Albums
 Keep On Keepin' On, by Brenda Patterson, 1970
 Keep On Keepin' On (New Riders of the Purple Sage album), 1989
 Keep On Keepin' On (Chuck Wagon Gang album), 1993
 Keep On Keepin' On, by Tom Shaka, 2002
 Keep On Keepin' On, by Kashief Lindo, 2008
 Keep On Keepin' On, by The Riptide Movement, 2012

Songs
 "Keep On Keeping On", by Len Chandler 1964, from the album To Be a Man 1966 - cited in speech by Martin Luther King Jr.
 "Keep On Keeping On", by Ruby Johnson, Parker, Catron, Johnson, 1967
 "Keep On Keeping On", by N. F. Porter 1971, covered by Joy Division
 "Keep On Keeping On", by Curtis Mayfield on Roots, 1971
 "Keep On Keepin' On", performed by The Sylvers from Showcase, 1975
 "Keep On Keeping On", by Rose Royce from Car Wash: Original Motion Picture Soundtrack, 1976
 "Keep On Keeping On", by Side Effect from Goin' Bananas
 "Keep On Keeping On", by The Redskins, 1984
 "Keep On Keepin' On", by New Riders of the Purple Sage, from the album of the same name, 1989
"Keep On Keepin' On" (MC Lyte song), Jermaine Dupri, 1996
 "Keep On Keepin' On", by Paul Gilbert on Burning Organ, 2002
 "Keep On Keepin' On", by Tech N9ne from Absolute Power, 2002
 "Keep on Keepin' On", by JoJo from JoJo, 2004
 "Keep On Keeping On", by Tone Damli from Bliss, 2005
 "Keep On Keeping On", by Danger Danger from Revolve, 2009
 "Keep On Keeping On", by Travis McCoy, 2014 
"Keep On Keepin' On", by Bleached from the album Welcome the Worms, 2016

See also 
 Keep Keepin' On: The Best of the Arista Years, compilation album by General Johnson including "Keep Keepin' On" 1976